The Strength of Donald McKenzie is a 1916 American silent drama film directed by and starring William Russell and John Prescott. The film also stars Charlotte Burton, Harry Keenan, George Ahern, Nell Franzen, and Margaret Nichols.

Cast
William Russell as Donald McKenzie
Charlotte Burton as Mabel Condon
George Ahern as John Condon
Harry Keenan as Maynard Randall
John Prescott as Pierre
Nell Franzen
Margaret Nichols

References

External links

1916 films
1916 drama films
Silent American drama films
American silent feature films
American black-and-white films
1910s American films